Tongji Bridge can refer to:

Tongji Bridge (Foshan)：in Foshan, Guangdong, China.
Tongji Bridge (Jingjing)：in Jingjing County, Hebei, China.
Tongji Bridge (Yuyao)：in Yuyao, Zhejiang, China.
Tongji Bridge (Jinhua)：in Jinhua, Zhejiang, China.
Tongji Bridge (Yi County)：in Yi County, Anhui, China.

Another name of Jiangdong Bridge (江东桥)：in Zhangzhou, Fujian, China.